Hunnicutt is a surname. Notable people with the surname include:

 Arthur Hunnicutt, American actor
 Benjamin Kline Hunnicutt, professor of Leisure Studies at the University of Iowa
 Gayle Hunnicutt, American actress
 R. P. Hunnicutt, American historian, known for research for armored fighting vehicles

Fictional characters:

 B. J. Hunnicutt, fictional character in TV series M*A*S*H
 Danika Hunnicutt, fictional character in TV series American Dragon: Jake Long
 Jolene Hunnicutt, fictional character in TV series Alice
 Liam Hunnicutt, fictional character in animated TV series The Loud House

See also
 Chinh-Hunnicutt affair, Vietnam war political scandal
 H. P. Hunnicutt Field, stadium in Princeton, West Virginia
 Holnicote Estate
 Honeycutt